Reader Rabbit 2 is a 1991 educational video game, the sequel to Reader Rabbit and the fourth game in the Reader Rabbit franchise. A facelift was given to the game's predecessor to match the graphical fidelity of Reader Rabbit 2.

Gameplay
The game can be played with the keyboard or a mouse. Set in a location called Wordsville, the game contained four word-based minigames. Players are taught about vowel sounds and how to construct sentences.

Reception

Heidi E.H. Aycock of Compute! praised the game for demonstrating how educational games could be as visually and aurally stunning: as other genres of video gaming. Game Players PC Entertainment reviewed the game as a solid choice for young players at school and home.

References

External links
 

1991 video games
1994 video games
1997 video games
Children's educational video games
The Learning Company games
Reader Rabbit
Video game remakes
DOS games
Windows games
Classic Mac OS games
Video games about rabbits and hares
Video games developed in the United States
Single-player video games